Daniel Chitsulo (born 7 March 1983) is a Malawian former professional footballer who played as a striker and spent most of his career in Germany and represented the Malawi national team internationally.

Career
Chitsulo was born in Zomba. He was the first Malawian born footballer who scored a professional goal in a European League.

References

External links
 
 

1983 births
Living people
Malawian emigrants to Germany
People from Zomba District
Association football forwards
Malawian footballers
Malawi international footballers
Civo United FC players
VfL Osnabrück players
Rot Weiss Ahlen players
Rot-Weiss Essen players
1. FC Köln II players
SC Preußen Münster players
2. Bundesliga players
3. Liga players
Expatriate footballers in Germany
Malawian expatriate footballers